Thomson is a railway station on the Walhalla narrow gauge line in Gippsland, Victoria, Australia, located where the line crossed the Thomson River.  The station was situated on the section of line closed in 1944.

The station reopened in 1995, and is now the headquarters of the Walhalla Goldfields Railway. The platform and wooden station building had been reconstructed at Thomson for use by WGR tourist trains as the current terminus.  The large bridge across the Thomson exists at the down end of the station, while two trestle bridges at the up end of the station have been dismantled in preparation for their restoration as part of a future extension of the railway to Erica.

Victoria (Australia) tourist railway stations
Transport in Gippsland (region)
Shire of Baw Baw
Walhalla railway line